Picnic at Hanging Rock is an Australian mystery romantic drama television series that premiered on Foxtel's Showcase on 6 May 2018. The series was adapted from Joan Lindsay's 1967 novel of the same name about a group of schoolgirls who, while on an outing to Hanging Rock, mysteriously disappear. The score won the Screen Music Award for Best Music for a Television Series

Plot
Hester Appleyard purchases an isolated mansion out in the Australian bush to transform into a school for young ladies - a few months later, Appleyard College is a success. On Valentine's Day, 1900, when students and staff go for a picnic to Hanging Rock, three of the school's star students and their governess mysteriously vanish. Their disappearance leaves a devastating impact on students, staff, their enigmatic and formidable headmistress and the township at large. Theories abound, secrets are exposed and hysteria sets in, until eventually, the lives of the characters unravel.

Cast and characters 
 Natalie Dormer as Mrs Hester Appleyard, headmistress
 Lily Sullivan as Miranda Reid
 Lola Bessis as Mademoiselle Dianne de Poitiers, mistress of French Conversation
 Harrison Gilbertson as Michael Fitzhubert
 Samara Weaving as Irma Leopold
 Madeleine Madden as Marion Quade
 Inez Currõ as Sara Waybourne
 Ruby Rees as Edith Horton
 Yael Stone as Miss Dora Lumley, mistress of Deportment and Bible Studies 
 Philip Quast as Arthur Appleyard, Hester's late husband
 Marcus Graham as Tomasetti
 James Hoare as Albert Crundall
 Mark Coles Smith as Tom
 Don Hany as Dr. Mackenzie

Supporting cast

 Anna McGahan as Miss Greta McCraw, mistress of Geography and Mathematics
 Sibylla Budd as Mrs Valange, mistress of Art and Literature
 Randall Berger
 Kate Bradford as Rose Kenton
 Ines English
 Kaarin Fairfax as Cook
 John Flaus as Mr. Whitehead, the gardener
 Mayah Fredes as Rosamund Swift
 Roslyn Gentle as Mrs. Fitzhubert
 Emily Gruhl as Minnie
 Kym Gyngell as Charlie Seymour-Baker
 Huw Higginson as Jasper Cosgrove
 Rob Jacobson
 Felix Johnson as Trooper Nolan
 Markella Kavenagh as Myrtle
 Julie Nihill as Mrs. Horton
 Jonny Pasvolsky as Sgt. Bumpher
 Alyssa Tuddenham as Lily Kenton
 Bethany Whitmore as Blanche Gifford

Production
Filming commenced in February 2017 at Labassa, Caulfield, Mandeville Hall, Toorak, Rippon Lea, Elsternwick, Werribee Park, as well as Lysterfield Park and on Fraser St in the Victorian goldfields town of Clunes.

Episodes

Broadcast

The series premiered in Australia on Showcase in 2018. The program was acquired by the BBC in the United Kingdom, Canal+ in France, RTÉ in Ireland and Amazon Video in the United States. The series was also broadcast in Greece by ERT.

See also
 Picnic at Hanging Rock, a 1975 film adaptation
 Picnic at Hanging Rock, the novel

References

External links 
 Picnic at Hanging Rock - Foxtel
 

Fiction set in 1900
2018 Australian television series debuts
2010s Australian drama television series
2010s LGBT-related television series
2010s mystery television series
Australian mystery television series
English-language television shows
Lesbian-related television shows
Showcase (Australian TV channel) original programming
Television shows set in Victoria (Australia)
Television shows based on Australian novels
Television series by Fremantle (company)
Television series set in the 1900s